Pakir Ali is a Sri Lankan retired professional footballer and football coach, who currently manages Bangladesh Premier League side Bangladesh Police FC. His last success was leading the Sheikh Jamal Dhanmondi Club to the Bangladesh League 2011 crown. As a footballer, he played for Bangladeshi clubs Dhaka Abahani, Dhaka Mohammedan and Indian club Vasco SC Goa during the late 1980s and early 90s.

Biography 
Pakir was a passionate footballer and currently a successful football coach. He holds AFC A coaching license. Since 2016, he has been working as the head coach of the Sri Lanka national football team. He was also in charge of Chirag United Kerala FC in the I-League, but his team relegated form the 2011–12 season.

See also
 Sri Lanka national football team
 Bangladesh Police FC
 Chirag United Kerala FC

References

Living people
Sri Lankan football managers
Abahani Limited (Dhaka) players
Sri Lanka national football team managers
Sri Lankan footballers
1953 births
Expatriate footballers in Bangladesh
Bangladesh Football Premier League managers
Association footballers not categorized by position
Sri Lankan expatriate footballers
Expatriate footballers in India
Sri Lankan expatriate sportspeople in India
Sri Lankan expatriates in Bangladesh